Banksia gardneri var. brevidentata is a variety of prostrate shrub that is endemic to the south-west of Western Australia.

References

 
 
 

gardneri subsp. brevidentata
Eudicots of Western Australia